Liberty! is a 1997 album by Mark O'Connor, which comprises his soundtrack to the six-part PBS series Liberty!. The album is composed mostly of period songs arranged by O'Connor, with the exception of "Freedom" and the theme for the series, written by O'Connor, entitled "Song of the Liberty Bell".

Track listing
All tracks except for "Freedom" were arranged or written by Mark O'Connor.
"Song of the Liberty Bell" (folk version) – 5:45
"Johnny Has Gone for a Soldier" (traditional) (feat. James Taylor) – 2:56
"Surrender the Sword" (for violin and strings) – 9:24
"Soldier's Joy" (traditional) – 4:06
"When Bidden to the Wake or Fair" (William Shield) – 7:08
"The World Turned Upside Down" (traditional) – 2:45
"Bunker Hill" (Andrew Law) – 5:43
"Freedom" (Richard Einhorn) – 3:40
"The Flowers of Edinburgh" (traditional) – 4:15
"Brave Wolfe" (traditional) – 6:47
"Devil's Dream" (traditional) – 3:27
"Song of the Liberty Bell" (O'Connor) – 6:45

Personnel
Mark O'Connor - Violin
James Taylor - Vocals, Guitar
Yo-Yo Ma - Cello
Wynton Marsalis - Trumpet
also:
Mark O'Connor - Producer
Laraine Perri - Executive Producer
Dave Sinko, Charles Harbutt, Eric Prestige - Engineers
Glenn Spinner, Tracy Hackney, Mark Wessel, Paul Falcone - Assistant Engineers
Dave Sinko, Richard King - Mix Engineers
Mark O'Connor - Editing and Additional Mixing

References

Mark O'Connor albums
1997 albums